Gustaf Walfrid Hellman (17 November 1883 – 7 October 1952) was a Swedish sport shooter who competed in the 1920 Summer Olympics. In 1920 he won the bronze medal as member of the Swedish team in the team 300 metre military rifle, standing competition.

References

External links
profile

1883 births
1952 deaths
Swedish male sport shooters
ISSF rifle shooters
Olympic shooters of Sweden
Shooters at the 1920 Summer Olympics
Olympic bronze medalists for Sweden
Olympic medalists in shooting
Medalists at the 1920 Summer Olympics
19th-century Swedish people
20th-century Swedish people